The Mountain Bike Centre is a cycling venue in Deodoro Pentathlon Park, located in the Deodoro district of the West Zone in Rio de Janeiro, Brazil.

The facility hosted the mountain biking events for the 2016 Summer Olympics.

See also
Fort Copacabana — another 2016 Summer Olympic cycling venue.

References

Deodoro Olympic Park
Sports venues in Rio de Janeiro (city)
Venues of the 2016 Summer Olympics
Olympic cycling venues
Sports venues completed in 2016